The Academy Award For Best Actress is an award presented annually by the Academy of Motion Picture Arts and Sciences (AMPAS). It is given to an actress who has delivered an outstanding performance in a leading role in a film released that year. The award is traditionally presented by the previous year's Best Actor winner. 

The 1st Academy Awards ceremony was held in 1929 with Janet Gaynor receiving the award for her roles in 7th Heaven, Street Angel, and Sunrise. Currently, nominees are determined by single transferable vote within the actors branch of AMPAS; winners are selected by a plurality vote from the entire eligible voting members of the Academy. In the first three years of the awards, actresses were nominated as the best in their categories. At that time, all of their work during the qualifying period (as many as three films, in some cases) was listed after the award. However, during the 3rd ceremony held in 1930, only one of those films was cited in each winner's final award, even though each of the acting winners had two films following their names on the ballots. The following year, the current system was introduced in which an actress is nominated for a specific performance in a single film. Starting with the 9th ceremony held in 1937, the category was officially limited to five nominations per year.

Since its inception, the award has been given to 78 actresses. Katharine Hepburn has won the most awards in this category, with four, followed by Frances McDormand, with three. With 17 nominations, Meryl Streep is the most nominated in this category, resulting in two wins. Jeanne Eagels is the only actress to be posthumously nominated in the category for The Letter (1929). Italian actress Sophia Loren was the first winner for a non-English language performance for Two Women (1961). At age 21, Marlee Matlin became the youngest actress to win this award for Children of a Lesser God (1986), and at age 80, Jessica Tandy became the oldest winner in this category for Driving Miss Daisy (1989). Halle Berry is the first woman of color to win in this category, for Monster's Ball (2001). Jodie Foster is the only openly LGBT woman to win in this category, for The Accused (1988), and The Silence of the Lambs (1991), although she was not publicly out until after both wins. As of the 2023 ceremony, Michelle Yeoh is the most recent winner for her role as Evelyn Quan Wang in Everything Everywhere All at Once, making her the first Asian and Malaysian actress and the second woman of color to win in this category.

Winners and nominees 
In the following table, the years are listed as per Academy convention, and generally correspond to the year of film release in Los Angeles County; the ceremonies are always held the following year. For the first five ceremonies, the eligibility period spanned twelve months from August 1 to July 31. For the 6th ceremony held in 1934, the eligibility period lasted from August 1, 1932, to December 31, 1933. Since the 7th ceremony held in 1935, the period of eligibility became the full previous calendar year from January 1 to December 31. Meryl Streep is the most nominated actress in this category with 17 nominations, winning in this category twice for Sophie's Choice (1982), and The Iron Lady (2011). Katharine Hepburn holds the records for most wins with 12 nominations and 4 wins for Morning Glory (1933), Guess Who's Coming to Dinner (1967), The Lion in Winter (1968), and On Golden Pond (1981).

1920s

1930s

1940s

1950s

1960s

1970s

1980s

1990s

2000s

2010s

2020s

Multiple wins and nominations

The following individuals received two or more Best Actress awards: 

The following individuals received four or more Best Actress nominations:

Age superlatives
{| class="wikitable sortable plainrowheaders" style="text-align:center;"
! scope="col" |Record
! scope="col" |Actor
! scope="col" |Film
! scope="col" |Year
! scope="col" |Age
! class="unsortable" scope="col" |
|-
|Oldest Winner
|Jessica Tandy
|Driving Miss Daisy
|1990
|80
|
|- style="height:4.5em;"
|Oldest Nominee
|Emmanuelle Riva
|Amour
|2013
|85
|
|- style="height:4.5em;"
|Youngest Winner
|Marlee Matlin
|Children of a Lesser God
|1987
|21
|
|- style="height:4.5em;"
|Youngest Nominee
|Quvenzhané Wallis
|Beasts of the Southern Wild
|2013
|9
|
|}

See also
 Academy Award for Best Actor
 All Academy Award acting nominees
 BAFTA Award for Best Actress in a Leading Role
 César Award for Best Actress
 Critics' Choice Movie Award for Best Actress
 Golden Globe Award for Best Actress in a Motion Picture – Drama
 Golden Globe Award for Best Actress – Motion Picture Comedy or Musical
 Independent Spirit Award for Best Female Lead
 Screen Actors Guild Award for Outstanding Performance by a Female Actor in a Leading Role

Notes

 A: Rules at the time of the first three ceremonies allowed for a performer to receive a single nomination which could honor their work in more than one film. Greta Garbo and Norma Shearer were both nominated for two different roles in the same category. Current Academy rules forbid this from happening. No official reason was ever given as to why Shearer won the award for only one of the two films she was listed for.
 B: Bette Davis's performance in Of Human Bondage was not nominated for an Oscar. Several influential people at the time campaigned to have her name included on the list, so for that year (and the following year also) the Academy relaxed its rules and allowed a write-in vote. Technically this meant that any performance was eligible to win the award, whether or not the person was an official nominee. While the Academy does not officially recognize this as a nomination for Davis, it has included her in the list of nominees for the 1935 ceremony on its official website.
 C: Both Katharine Hepburn and Barbra Streisand received the exact same number of votes, resulting in both actresses receiving the award, according to Academy rules.
 D: Elliot Page was nominated before his gender transition in 2020.

References

Bibliography

External links

 Oscars.org (official Academy site)
 The Academy Awards Database (official site)
 Oscar.com (official ceremony promotional site)

Academy Awards
 
Film awards for lead actress